Robidas is a French-language surname. Notable people with the surname include:

Marcel Robidas (1923–2009), Canadian politician
Stéphane Robidas (born 1977), Canadian  ice hockey defenceman

See also
Robida

References 

French-language surnames